Kottiyoor is a village and Grama Panchayat  situated in eastern hilly area of Kannur district in Kerala state. Kottiyoor is the 23rd Wildlife Sanctuary of Kerala, located in the serene hills of Western Ghats. The ancient pilgrimage conducted here yearly, called 'Kottiyoor Vysakha Mahotsavam' attracts thousands of devotees every year. The Vavali river flows through Kottiyoor.

Etymology
"Kottiyoor" comes from Koodi(Meeting) and Uuru(Precinct); the name comes from the pilgrimage in the region. The mythology says that this is the place where the holy trinity (Brahma, Vishnu and Shiva), Veerabhadra, Bhadrakali, Shiva Bhutaganas, revered Sages and other holy men came together to complete the Daksha Yaga. It is believed that Sati Devi immolated herself here.
The etymology of most of the places on the way to Kottiyoor are also related to the mythology. Sati Devi's voyage to the "Yagashala" can be understood by the names of these area. The place where she desperately felt the need of Shiva and felt sad on his absence is called "Manathana". The place where Sati Devi cried is now the name of a nearby village called "Kanneer char". Another village nearby is "Aayothumchal", this is where Sati felt tired and rested for some time. An ox was provided from a place on the way for the tired Devi to ride, this place is now known as "Kelakam". There is a place called "Neendunokki" this is the place where Sati peeped at the distant 'Yaga-shala' when she heard the noise emanating from there. The place where she had to pay taxation is called - "Chungakunnu", where she walked slowly became "Mandhemcheri". The place where she became extremely tired and fell down is "Murchilakadu". "Mutherikavu" is a temple and the name of a village, it is where the sword which decapitated Daksha, was thrown by Veerabhadra . Stone hearths used for boiling milk came to be known as "Palukachiyamala".

Geography
Kottiyoor is a hilly village on the eastern side of Kannur district.  The terrain is undulating in nature and the extreme eastern side has forests bordering Karnataka state.

Demographics
As of 2011 Census, Kottiyoor village had population of 16,698 which constitutes 8,239 males and 8,459 females. The sex ratio of Kottiyoor was 1,027 lower than state average of 1,084. Population of children in the age group 0-6 was 1,568 (9.4%) where 786 are males and 782 are females. Kottiyoor had an overall literacy of 94.8% higher than state average of 94%. The male literacy stands at 95.8% and female literacy was 93.9%.

Kottiyoor Wildlife Sanctuary
Kottiyoor Wildlife Sanctuary in Kottiyoor is declared as a wild life sanctuary by the Government of Kerala in 2011. It is the 23rd wild life sanctuary in Kerala. The total area of the zone is 3,037.98 hectares. It is in addition to the Aralam wild life sanctuary in Kannur District. Kottiyoor Wild Life Sanctuary is adjacent to the Bandipur National Park, a tiger reserve park in Karnataka border.

Biodiversity
The place is a part of Northern Western Ghats, (WWF code IM0135), it is classified as a Tropical broad leaf forest. The region is a transition zone between the moist Cullenia-dominated forest in south to drier Dipterocarp forests in north. The region is classified under Critical biodiversity hot spot. The Kottiyoor forest is a part of Nilgiri Biosphere Reserve. Kottiyoor is connected to Wayanad through the Brahmagiri valley which is rich in wild flora and fauna.

Tourism
Kottiyoor is an exciting tourist spot for biologists, nature sight seers and mountaineering trekkers. Neendunokki, Palukachiyamala, Chappumala, pannyamal, Kelakam are all serene green places suitable for Eco tourism. The forest is serene, a large variety of birds and seasonal butterflies are seen here. Palukachipara's hilltop is a well known location for usual trekkers'.

Pilgrimage-Vysakha Mahotsavam

Kottiyoor Utsavam, the yaga festival in Akkare Kottiyoor Shrine,  is conducted yearly for 27 days commemorating the Daksha Yaga. The pilgrimage is on the west bank of Bavali river in a temporary shrine where the Swayambhu linga is present. During the time of pilgrimage the Ikkare Kottiyoor Temple will be closed. Thousands of pilgrims come to this place, the festival is in the rainy season of June–July.

Thruchherumana Temple (Kottiyoor Vadakkeshwaram Temple)

The Thruchherumana Temple or familiarly known as Ikkare Kottiyoor Kshetram is a prominent Shiva Temple, located on the east bank of Vavali river. It special category temple of Malabar Devaswom Board. The temple is mainly famous due to the yearly pilgrimage of Vysakha Mahotsavam in the other shrine on the west bank. The temple is closed during the Vysakha mahotsavam and open during the rest of the year.

Access

The national highway passes through Kannur town.  Mangalore and Mumbai can be accessed on the northern side and Cochin and Thiruvananthapuram can be accessed on the southern side.  The road to the east of Iritty connects to Mysore and Bangalore.   The nearest railway station is Kannur on Mangalore-Palakkad line. There are airports at Mangalore and Kannur.
There are road access from Kannur and Thalassery. From Kannur the route is through Chalode, Mattannur and Iritty; from Thalassery the route is through Koothuparamba. Akkare Kottiyoor temple is open during the annual festival for one month whereas the Ikkare Kottiyoor temple is open for 11 months.
 Road-Frequent bus services are available to Kottiyoor from Thalassery and Kannur
Kottiyyor is 125 km from Kozhikode
 Rail-Nearest railway station is Thalassery 60 km

Image gallery

See also

Kottiyoor Temple
Kottiyoor Vysakha Mahotsavam
Thalassery
Mattannur
Ambayathode
Chungakkunnu
Kottiyoor Honey

Bio-Diversity at Kottiyoor

References 

Villages near Iritty
Tourist attractions in Kannur district